Legislative elections were held for the first time in the territory of South West Africa on 26 May 1926. The German League in South West Africa won eight of the twelve elected seats in the Whites-only election.

Electoral system
The Legislative Assembly had 18 seats, of which twelve were elected in single-member constituencies, and six were appointed by the territory's Administrator, Albertus Johannes Werth. The twelve constituencies were Gibeon, Gobabis, Grootfontein, Keetmanshoop, Kolmanskop, Luderitz, Okahandja, Omaruru, Swakopmund, Warmbad, Windhoek Central and Windhoek District.

Results
German League candidates were returned unopposed in six of the twelve constituencies; Grootfontein, Keetmanshoop, Kolmanskop, Luderitz, Swakopmund and Windhoek. Of the six members appointed by Werth, two were from the German League and four from the National Party.

References

South West Africa
1926 in South West Africa
Elections in Namibia
Election and referendum articles with incomplete results